The Durlston Formation is a geologic formation in England. Particularly in the Isle of Purbeck. It preserves fossils dating back to the Berriasian stage of the Lower Cretaceous.

Vertebrate paleobiota

Crocodyliformes

See also

 List of fossiliferous stratigraphic units in England

References

 

Cretaceous England